Palk Gardel is a village in Arkavazi Rural District, Chavar District, Ilam County, Ilam Province, Iran. At the 2006 census, its population was 21, in 5 families.

References 

Populated places in Ilam County